The manga series Sweet Blue Flowers is written and illustrated by Takako Shimura. The series was serialized in Manga Erotics F between November 17, 2004 and July 6, 2013. The chapters were released in eight tankōbon volumes released by Ohta Publishing under their F×comics imprint between December 15, 2005 and September 12, 2013 in Japan. Viz Media licensed the manga for a physical release in North America as a 2-in-1 omnibus edition with a new translation. The manga already had an English digital release before this. The manga has been licensed for release in French by Asuka under the title Fleurs Bleues. Sweet Blue Flowers was adapted as an 11-episode anime television series by J.C.Staff which aired in Japan between July and September 2009 on Fuji TV. The story focuses on Fumi Manjōme, a lesbian high school girl, and her close childhood friend Akira Okudaira who tries to keep her friends happy through difficult times.


Volume list

See also

List of Sweet Blue Flowers episodes

References

Lists of manga volumes and chapters